Yibeltal Admassu (born 1980) is an Ethiopian runner who specializes in the 10,000 metres and cross-country running. He has not competed on top level since 2004.

In the photo on the right, Assefa Mezgebu and Haile Gebrselassie congratulate Yibeltal Admassu (#333) after he placed 4th in the World Championships 10,000 metres at Edmonton, Alberta, Canada, on August 8, 2001.

Achievements

Personal bests 
5000 metres - 13:11.34 min (2004)
10,000 metres - 27:41.82 min (2004)

External links

1980 births
Living people
Ethiopian male long-distance runners
Ethiopian male cross country runners
21st-century Ethiopian people